The Florida Distance Library Learning Initiative (DLLI) is a statewide courier system used by over 200 libraries within the state of Florida.  It is known for its distinctive orange courier bags.

DLLI (pronounced "dilly") is administered by the Tampa Bay Library Consortium.

References

External links
- DLLI Official Website  - http://www.tblc.org/delivery/index.shtml

Education in Florida